Kifri District is a districts of Sulaymaniyah Governorate in Kurdistan Region, Iraq. Its main town is Kifri. It is officially part of the Diyala Governorate, but under de facto control of the KRG.

There are two Kifri Districts in Iraq at the moment. There's one in Diyala Governorate and another in Sulaymaniyah Governorate. There used to be a singe unified Kifri District. However, in the past, most of the district, including its capital Kifri have come under the control of Iraqi Kurdistan Autonomous Region. Federal government of Iraq disputes this and claims that the entire district is officially part of Diyala Governorate. However, the Kurdish Government has created a new and independent district government, in the areas under its control, also called Kifri District. The Kurdish district also incorporates some additional territories, claimed by the Federal government as part of Tooz District in the Saladin Governorate, as well as territories undisputedly recognized by Baghdad as part of Sulaymaniyah Governorate. Thus two parallel districts, one under Diyala's jurisdiction, and another under Sulaymaniyah's jurisdiction exist, with overlapping control and claim. The subdistricts of this district include: Naojol, Awa Sapi, Sarqala, Kokis, and Kifri Central Subdistricts.

References 

Districts of Sulaymaniyah Province
Geography of Iraqi Kurdistan